Crown Mountain may refer to:

 A mountain near Urbenville, New South Wales, Australia
 Crown Mountain (Antarctica)
 Crown Mountain (North Shore Mountains), British Columbia, Canada
 Crown Mountain (Vancouver Island, British Columbia), Canada
 A mountain in Dahlonega, Georgia, United States
 Crown Mountain (Lewis and Clark County, Montana), a mountain in Lewis and Clark County, Montana
 A mountain peak in the Chisos Mountains of Texas, United States
 Crown Mountain (United States Virgin Islands)

See also
 The Crown (mountain), in the Karakoram mountain range in China
 Copple Crown Mountain, Brookfield, New Hampshire
 Iron Crown Mountain, near Haenertsburg, South Africa
 White Crown Mountain, Axel Heiberg Island, Nunavut, Canada